Albert Dutton MacDade (September 23, 1871 – October 4, 1954) was an American politician from Pennsylvania who served as district attorney for Delaware County from 1906 to 1912, as a Republican member of the Pennsylvania State Senate for the 9th Senatorial District from 1921 to 1929 and as Judge in the Pennsylvania Court of Common Pleas for Delaware County from 1942 to 1948.

Early life and education
MacDade was born in Marcus Hook, Pennsylvania, to Joseph Walker and Amie (Hedden) MacDade.  He graduated from Chester High School in 1888 and the University of Pennsylvania Law School in 1894.

Career
In 1894, MacDade was accepted to the Delaware County bar.  He served as the district attorney of Delaware county from 1906 to 1912 and as a Pennsylvania State Senator from 1920 to 1928.

MacDade was elected judge of the Delaware County Court of Common Pleas from 1942 to 1948 and served as president judge in 1943

He is interred at the Lawn Croft Cemetery in Linwood, Pennsylvania.

Personal life
MacDade married Mabel Troth in 1899 and together they had two children.

MacDade was a member of the First Baptist Church in Chester, Pennsylvania.

MacDade was a member of the American and State Bar Associations, the Pennsylvania National Guard for three years and was a "four-minute man" and chairman of the legal advisory board of Chester, Pennsylvania during World War I.  He was a member of the Improved Order of Red Men, the Independent Order of Odd Fellows, the Patriotic Order of the Sons of America, the Loyal Order of Moose and was a thirty-second degree Mason.

Legacy
In 1933, Parker Avenue in Collingdale, Pennsylvania, was renamed MacDade Boulevard in honor of MacDade.

References

1871 births
1954 deaths
20th-century American politicians
American Freemasons
Burials at Lawn Croft Cemetery
Chester High School alumni
County district attorneys in Pennsylvania
Judges of the Pennsylvania Courts of Common Pleas
Pennsylvania lawyers
Pennsylvania National Guard personnel
Republican Party Pennsylvania state senators
People from Marcus Hook, Pennsylvania
University of Pennsylvania Law School alumni